Audio Noir is the debut studio album by the English heavy metal band Bossk. It was recorded by Martin Ruffin at In Lieu of a Studio in Battle, East Sussex, and released via Deathwish Inc. on 1 April 2016.

Background
Audio Noir was recorded, engineered, mixed and produced at In Lieu Of A Studio in Battle, East Sussex by Martin Ruffin in the summer of 2015 and completed in September 2015. Premier single “Kobe” debuted on BBC’s Rock Show with Daniel P. Carter and was made available for streaming on 8 February 2016. The same day the track listing and title, Audio Noir was announced and set to be released on 1 April 2016 via Deathwish Records. Four days later the video for “Kobe” premiered via Nerdist along with the album art work. On the day of release, the full album was streamed via BandCamp. In a press release with Terrorizer, remarking on the writing process, the band stated:

Reception

Upon release, Audio Noir was mostly well received and garnered largely positive reviews by fans and critics alike. Wil Cifer of No Clean Singing described that album as a “[refusal] to compose in a formulaic manner” with an “urgent sense of motion”. Cifer describes the vocals as “buried in the wall of guitars they slam you into” clarifying “the anger here becomes very tangible” at times. In summation he states, “If the run-of-the-mill post-metal bands leave you wanting more than their minimalism allows, and sludge feels like cavemen screaming at you, then these guys have found you the perfect middle ground.” Simon of The Monolith gave the album a positive review stating that the album’s “songs lurch from delicate, spacious and dreamy post-rock to portentous, doom-drenched, heavy riffing – often in a heartbeat.”, commenting that Bossk “mean business. Serious, gorgeous business.”

Track listing

Personnel
Bossk
 Sam Marsh – vocals
 Rob Vaughan – guitar
 Alex Hamilton – guitars
 Tom Begley – bass guitar
 Nick Corney – drums, samples
Production
 Seldon Hunt – artwork
 Martin Ruffin – producer, mixer, engineer

References

2016 albums
Bossk (band) albums
Albums produced by Martin Ruffin
Deathwish Inc. albums